The Ottawa Internet Exchange (OttIX) was a federally incorporated not-for-profit Internet Exchange Point (IXP) located in Ottawa, Ontario, Canada.  , OttIX had 13 members  Traffic rates were as high as 420Mbit/s at peak.

Ottawa-Gatineau Internet Exchange (OGIX) is now providing this service for the National Capital Region (Canada).

Notes

See also 
 List of Internet exchange points

External links
 Archive of Official OttIX website

Internet exchange points in Canada
Communications in Ontario
Organizations based in Ottawa